Cory James Abbott (born September 20, 1995) is an American professional baseball pitcher for the Washington Nationals of Major League Baseball (MLB). He played college baseball at Loyola Marymount University. He was drafted by the Chicago Cubs in the second round of the 2017 Major League Baseball draft and made his MLB debut with them in 2021.

Amateur career
Abbott attended Junipero Serra High School in San Diego, California. As a senior, he went 7–2 with a 1.52 earned run average (ERA). 

Undrafted out of high school in the 2014 MLB draft, he enrolled and played college baseball at Loyola Marymount University. In 2016, he played collegiate summer baseball with the Orleans Firebirds of the Cape Cod Baseball League. As a junior in 2017, he went 11–2 with a 1.74 ERA in 15 starts, with 130 strikeouts (2nd in the conference) in 98.1 innings. and threw a perfect game. After the season, he was drafted by the Chicago Cubs in the second round of the 2017 Major League Baseball draft.

Professional career

Chicago Cubs
Abbott signed with the Cubs and made his professional season with the Eugene Emeralds, compiling a 3.86 ERA over 14 innings. He pitched 2018 with the South Bend Cubs and Myrtle Beach Pelicans, going 8–6 with a 2.50 ERA in 22 starts, and 131 strikeouts in 115 innings, between the two clubs. 

He spent 2019 with the Tennessee Smokies, pitching to an 8–8 record with a 3.01 ERA over 26 starts, striking out 166 (leading the league) over  innings.

Abbott did not play a minor league game in 2020 due to the cancellation of the minor league season caused by the COVID-19 pandemic. The Cubs added Abbott to their 40-man roster after the 2020 season. 

On June 5, 2021, Abbott was promoted to the major leagues for the first time. He made his MLB debut that day, pitching two scoreless innings of relief against the San Francisco Giants. In the game, he also notched his first major league strikeout, punching out Giants pitcher Kevin Gausman. On June 20, 2021, the Cubs optioned Abbott to AAA Iowa. On October 1, Abbott collected his first career hit, a single off of St. Louis Cardinals starter Dakota Hudson. 

On April 16, 2022, Abbott was designated for assignment by the Cubs.

Washington Nationals
On April 21, 2022, Abbott was traded to the San Francisco Giants for cash considerations. Abbott was claimed off waivers by the Washington Nationals on May 4. He made 16 appearances (9 starts) for Washington down the stretch, posting an 0-5 record and 5.25 ERA with 45 strikeouts in 48.0 innings pitched.

Abbott was optioned to the Triple-A Rochester Red Wings to begin the 2023 season.

References

External links

1995 births
Living people
Baseball players from San Diego
Chicago Cubs players
Eugene Emeralds players
Iowa Cubs players
Loyola Marymount Lions baseball players
Major League Baseball pitchers
Myrtle Beach Pelicans players
Orleans Firebirds players
South Bend Cubs players
Tennessee Smokies players
Washington Nationals players
Peninsula Oilers players